Jacques Berlioz (9 November 1953, Chambéry) is a French historian.

Biography 
A student at the École Nationale des Chartes, he graduated in 1977 with a thesis devoted to the Tractatus de diversis materiis predicabilibus by Stephen of Bourbon.
 
Jacques Berlioz has taught in the universities of Lyon 2, Lausanne, Geneva and Fribourg.

From 2006 to 2011, he was director of the École Nationale des Chartes.

Publications 
 (with Christian Rochet) Guide du généalogiste et du biographe dans le Jura, CDDP du Jura, Dole, 1980  ; 
 Catalogue des journaux et périodiques conservés dans le département du Jura, Archives départementales du Jura, Montmorot, 1981 ; 
 (with Patrick Arabeyre and Philippe Poirrier) Saint-Bernard en Bourgogne : lieux et mémoires, les Éditions du Bien public, Dijon, 1990  ; 
 Jacques Berlioz, Marie-Anne Polo de Beaulieu (dir.), Les Exempla médiévaux, GARAE-Hésiode, Carcassonne, 1992  ;
 Vies et légendes de Saint Bernard : création, diffusion, réception. Actes des rencontres de Dijon. 6 et 7 juin 1991, with Philippe Poirrier and Patrick Arabeyre, Cîteaux, Cîteaux, commentarii cistercienses, 1993. 
 « Tuez-les tous, Dieu reconnaîtra les siens », la croisade contre les Albigeois vue par Césaire de Heisterbach, Loubatières, Toulouse, 1994  ;
 Jacques Berlioz (dir.), Moines et religieux au Moyen Âge, Seuil, coll. "Points histoire", Paris, 1994  ; 
 Jacques Berlioz (dir.), Identifier sources et citations, Brepols, coll. "L'Atelier du médiéviste", Paris, 1994  ; 
 Le Commentaire de documents en histoire médiévale, Seuil, Paris, 1996  ; 
 Jacques Berlioz, Marie-Anne Polo de Beaulieu (dir.), Les Exempla médiévaux : nouvelles perspectives, H. Champion, Paris, 1998  ; 
 Catastrophes naturelles et calamités au Moyen Âge, Ed. del Galluzzo, Florence, 1998.  ; 
 Le Pays cathare : les religions médiévales et leurs expressions méridionales, Seuil, coll. "Points histoire", 2000  ;
 (avec Jean-Luc Eichenlaub) Stephani de Borbone Tractatus de diuersis materiis predicabilibus. Prologus. Pars prima, "de dono timoris", Brepols, Turnhout, 2002 .
 Stephani de Borbone Tractatus de diversis materiis predicabilibus. Tertia pars, "de dono scientie", Brepols, Turnhout, 2006 .
 Jacques Berlioz, Marie Anne Polo de Beaulieu, Pascal Collomb (dir.), Le Tonnerre des exemples. Exempla et médiation culturelle dans l'Occident médiéval, Presses universitaires de Rennes, Rennes, 2010 .
 Jacques Berlioz, Marie Anne Polo de Beaulieu (dir.), Collectio exemplorum Cisterciensis in codice Parisiensi 15912 asseruata, Brepols, Turnhout, 2012 .

External links 
 L’Histoire, mai 2015, par Jacques Berlioz
 List of publications
 Le plan-relief de Grenoble on YouTube

French medievalists
École Nationale des Chartes alumni
Academic staff of the University of Lausanne
Writers from Chambéry
1953 births
Living people
Historians of Catharism